The James E. Collins House in Franklin, Tennessee, United States, was listed on the National Register of Historic Places but was removed in 1995.  The property was also known as Anderson House.

It was built or has other significance as of c.1866, and included Central passage plan and other architecture.

The property was covered in a 1988 study of Williamson County historical resources.

References

1866 establishments in Tennessee
Central-passage houses in Tennessee
Former National Register of Historic Places in Tennessee
Houses completed in 1866
Houses in Franklin, Tennessee
Houses on the National Register of Historic Places in Tennessee
National Register of Historic Places in Williamson County, Tennessee